Ithu Pathiramanal (English: Sands of Night) is a 2013 Malayalam action film directed by M. Padmakumar starring Unni Mukundan in the lead role with Jayasurya and Ramya Nambeeshan . The shooting locations are in Marayur, Pathiramanal and Alapuzha. The film become a flop at the box office.

Plot
The story is about a private financer Eldho, who lives in a hill station with his mother. His mother had become mentally challenged after she was raped by a police constable during Eldho's childhood. His mother conceived from the rape and gave birth to a baby girl. Johnkutty, Eldho's father is avenging his wife's rape by going after the police constable and unfortunately dies.

After Eldho has grown up, he reaches Pathiramanal, a place in Kuttanad, in search of the constable to take revenge. There he meets Sara. He realizes that Sara is the daughter of the constable.

Cast
 Unni Mukundan as Eldho
 Jayasurya as Johnkutty
 Remya Nambeesan as Sara
 Pradeep Rawat as Shouri
 Bhagath Manuel as Murukan
 Shalu Menon as Ambika
 Kunchan as Chellapanashari
 Mahesh
 Anil Murali as Thankan
 Master Siddharth
 Jyothi Krishna as Salomi
 P.Balachandran as priest

Production
The shoot of the film  started at Alappuzha in May. The shooting was stopped for a while because of lead actor Jayasurya's injury during Vaadhyar film action sequence. Jayasurya was doing both the role of father and son in the film. But due to his injury, the son's role was filled by Unni Mukundan.

Soundtrack
The soundtrack features three songs composed by Afzal Yusuff with lyrics by Vayalar Sarath Chandra Varma and Beeyar Prasad.

References

External links
 

2010s Malayalam-language films
2013 action drama films
2013 films
Indian action drama films
Films shot in Munnar
Films shot in Alappuzha
Films directed by M. Padmakumar